Václav Jindřich Veit known in German as Wenzel Heinrich Veit (19 January 1806 in the village of Řepnice, now part of Libochovany, near Litoměřice – 16 February 1864, Litoměřice) Czech composer, copyist, pianist and lawyer.

To pay tuition at a law school in Prague, Veit gave music lessons. After earning his law degree and getting a position as a legal clerk, Veit continued to teach music and even started writing music. He wrote mostly chamber music, and later on in his life wrote more and more songs with texts in Czech, such as "Pozdravení pěvcovo". He also wrote some church music, including a setting of the Te Deum and a couple of masses. Although he wrote some orchestral music, such as a violin concertino and a parody of Berlioz's Symphonie fantastique, Veit only wrote one symphony, in E minor, which is however considered "a notable milestone in the development of the Czech symphonic style."

References

External links
 
 
 

1806 births
1864 deaths
Czech male classical composers
Czech classical pianists
19th-century Czech lawyers
Czech Romantic composers
19th-century classical composers
19th-century classical pianists
Male classical pianists
String quartet composers
19th-century Czech male musicians
String quartet composers